Hilmar Guenther Moore (July 28, 1920 – December 4, 2012) was an American rancher and long-time Mayor of Richmond, Texas.

Biography 
Hilmar Moore was a cattleman and a fifth-generation Texan, the grandson of Texas Secretary of State John M. Moore. Moore's father John Moore Jr. served also as Mayor of Richmond. Moore served in World War II.  Moore was married to Evalyn Wendt Moore, who succeeded him as mayor.

Mayor of Richmond 
Moore was first elected as the Mayor of Richmond in 1949 and remained in office until his death in 2012, making him "probably the longest-serving elected official in the US," according to a 2008 BBC News report, though even as late as 2012 Richmond only described him as the longest serving Mayor in Texas, and the second in the US.

In the segregated 1950s and 1960s, Moore persuaded restaurants in Richmond to integrate.

He was honored with a life-size statue at City Hall in October 2008.

Moore's father, John Jr., served as a two-term Mayor of Richmond and a two-term judge in Fort Bend County, Texas. Hilmar's grandfather, John Sr., was a United States Congressman and Secretary of State of Texas.

Chair of Texas Department of Human Resources 
Moore was appointed to the Department of Human Resources by Texas Governor Dolph Briscoe.  During his term, Moore stated to the press that he believed people on welfare should be sterilized, though this was a "personal opinion and [he] did not intend to seek a state sterilization policy".

Death 
Moore died on December 4, 2012.  A memorial service was held on December 10.  His widow, Evalyn W. Moore, was appointed to serve out the remainder of his term, and served as mayor until November 16, 2020, when she was succeeded by Rebecca Kennelly Haas.

References

1920 births
2012 deaths
Mayors of places in Texas
People from Richmond, Texas
People from San Antonio